In epidemiology, force of infection (denoted ) is the rate at which susceptible individuals acquire an infectious disease. Because it takes account of susceptibility it can be used to compare the rate of transmission between different groups of the population for the same infectious disease, or even between different infectious diseases.

Such a calculation is difficult because not all new infections are reported, and it is often difficult to know how many susceptibles were exposed. However,  can be calculated for an infectious disease in an endemic state if homogeneous mixing of the population and a rectangular population distribution (such as that generally found in developed countries), rather than a pyramid, is assumed. In this case,  is given by:

 

where  is the average age of infection. In other words,  is the average time spent in the susceptible group before becoming infected. The rate of becoming infected is therefore  (since rate is 1/time). The advantage of this method of calculating  is that data on the average age of infection is very easily obtainable, even if not all cases of the disease are reported.

See also
Basic reproduction number
Compartmental models in epidemiology
Epidemic
Mathematical modelling of infectious disease

References

Further reading
 Muench, H. (1934) Derivation of rates from summation data by the catalytic curve. Journal of the American Statistical Association, 29: 25–38.

Epidemiology